The Faro Island tree frog (Ranoidea lutea), also known as Solomon Islands treefrog, is a species of frog in the subfamily Pelodryadinae. It is found in Papua New Guinea and Solomon Islands. Its natural habitat is subtropical or tropical moist lowland forests. It is threatened by habitat loss.

References

Ranoidea
Taxonomy articles created by Polbot
Amphibians described in 1887